Milivoje Božović (born December 15, 1985) is a Serbian professional basketball player for KK Budućnost Bijeljina of the First League of Republika Srpska.

Career
He played with Belgrade clubs Lavovi 063, Mega Vizura and OKK Beograd before joining Hemofarm where he spent four seasons. In the summer of 2011 he signed with Budućnost Podgorica, but was released in November 2011. In December 2011, he signed with Sant'Antimo of the Legadue, for the rest of the season.

In January 2013, he returned to Serbia and signed with Borac Čačak. During the summer of 2013 he was on trial with Alba Berlin and Turów Zgorzelec, but did not signed. In November 2013, he returned to Borac Čačak, but after only one game he left them and signed with Vojvodina Srbijagas for the rest of the season.

In September 2014, he signed with SCM CSU Craiova in Romania. In 2020, Božović joined KK Čelik. He parted ways with the team on 6 December 2021. On 15 December, Božović signed with KK Budućnost Bijeljina of the First League of Republika Srpska.

References

External links
 Milivoje Božović at aba-liga.com
 Milivoje Božović at eurobasket.com
 Milivoje Božović at fiba.com

1985 births
Living people
ABA League players
Basketball League of Serbia players
KK Borac Čačak players
KK Budućnost players
KK Hemofarm players
KK Kakanj players
KK Lavovi 063 players
KK Mega Basket players
KK Vojvodina Srbijagas players
OKK Beograd players
OKK Sloboda Tuzla players
Power forwards (basketball)
Serbian expatriate basketball people in Bosnia and Herzegovina
Serbian expatriate basketball people in Italy
Serbian expatriate basketball people in Hungary
Serbian expatriate basketball people in Morocco
Serbian expatriate basketball people in Romania
Serbian men's basketball players
Sportspeople from Nikšić